The Dictionary of Minor Planet Names is a reference book containing information about the discovery and naming of 12,804 asteroids (March 2006). It is published by the International Astronomical Union.

Editions  
 
 
 (5,252 names, 7,041 numbered until June 1996)
 
  (+10,000 names)
 
 
  (+17,000 names)
  (22,000 names)

Astronomy books